Bandera State Airport  is a public use airport located in Bandera, King County, Washington, United States. It is owned by the Washington State DOT Aviation Division.

This airport was constructed in 1948 as one of the first state airports. The airport is a few feet off Interstate 90. It is an excellent location for mountain flying practice. Though surrounded by mountains, the valley is wide enough for maneuvering most light aircraft. The airport is frequently used by instructors for training students in soft field work and in mountain flying. Glider clubs frequently base out of Bandera.

Facilities and aircraft 
The runway has a turf surface measuring 2,344 by 200 feet (714 x 61 m) which is extremely soft when wet.

Field elevation is 1,636 feet (499 m) above mean sea level, and some density altitude problems can be encountered on a summer day. Trees surround the airport close in, and there are trees close to each end of the field in the approaches. Elk, deer and motorcyclists may be encountered on the field. The surface is rough. Vehicle ruts, and frost heaved rocks are possible. The south third of the runway is almost always soft, and the runway is generally smoother the farther north you land. Overflight to check for surface damage, presence of obstructions, and height of grass is essential. The airport is usually open from June 1 to October 1.

For the 12-month period ending December 31, 2020, the airport had 300 general aviation aircraft operations, an average of 25 per calendar month (or, 75 per month during the 4 month season that the airport is open).

References

External links 
 Bandera State Airport page at WSDOT Aviation
 

Airports in King County, Washington